Our Only Chance is a Spanish musical and romantic drama television series created by Anaïs Schaaff, Jordi Calafí, and Joaquín Oristrell for Disney+. The series premiered on 2 December 2022 and stars Aitana Ocaña and Miguel Bernardeau.

Plot 
The plot follows the relationship between Candela (a worker for a logistics company and wannabe singer discovered by a record label executive in a bar) and Diego (an aspiring professional boxer and Candela's former high school classmate).

Cast

Production and release 
Created by Anaïs Schaaf, Jordi Calafí, and Joaquín Oristrell, the 5 episode-series is a Grupo Ganga production.  and Abigail Schaaff took over direction duties. Shooting locations included Madrid and Valencia.

Billed as "the first Disney+ Spanish original series", the aforementioned platform will release the series in Spain (as well as other territories) on 2 December 2022. Likewise, Star+ and Hulu will release the series in Latin America and the United States, respectively.

Episode list

Soundtrack 

La última (Banda Sonora Original) is the soundtrack album of the series by the same name, released on 2 December 2022 by Hollywood Records. All the songs were produced by Mauricio Rengifo and Andrés Torres. It includes eight songs performed by Aitana and eight acoustic tracks. The title track "La última" was released as a promotional single on 10 November 2022.

Track listing

"La última" interpolates "Skyscraper" (2011), written by Toby Gad, Lindy Robbins, and Kerli Koiv and performed by Demi Lovato.

Charts

Weekly charts

Year-end charts

References 

Television shows filmed in Spain
2022 Spanish television series debuts
Spanish-language television shows
2020s Spanish drama television series
Musical television series
Romantic drama television series
Star (Disney+) original programming
Boxing television series